The Seabird Half Rater is the oldest one design class still sailing in Britain. It is a 20 ft carvel planked sailing boat, with a design dating back to 1898. As of the 2017 season there have been 101 built [up to No.108]. The class has a Portsmouth Yardstick of 1229.

History

In the autumn of 1898 West Lancashire Yacht Club passed a resolution favouring the founding of a new One Design Class boat, not to cost more than £35 complete.

 
The class owes its inception and inspiration from the design by Mr. Herbert Baggs in collaboration with Mr. W. Scott Hayward who drew up the original plans on the back of a cigarette packet under a street lamp in Southport. The first eight boats were built by Latham of Crossens at a cost of £34 17s 6d each. The boats were named after Seabirds and their ratings were assessed at 0.5 hence the term Half Rater. The design is similar to that of a 0.75 rater but on a smaller scale and with one or two improvements, the most notable difference was the Seabird didn't have the overhanging 'counter' of the 0.75 rater.

The original 8 boats were balloted for once they were all complete, which was a good method of ensuring a strict compliance to the one design rules. Mr. Herbert Baggs and Mr. W. Scott Hayward dedication to the class was demonstrated by them being amongst the first owners of the new boats owning Seamew No. 7 and Fulmar No. 1 respectively.
 
The first race was sailed off the Southport Pierhead on 13 June 1899 when eight boats participated over a ten-mile course and Goshawk No.2, helmed by owner Mr Dudley Coddington took the winning gun, ahead of Fulmar No.1. Goshawk went on to have the best record in both the 1899 and 1900 seasons.

Within a year or two the Class was adopted by the Donaghadee Sailing Club under the name of 'The Seashells' and by Gourock YC under the title of 'The Gaels'. Inter club racing was first held on the waters of Belfast Lough during the summer of 1902 when a fleet of 17 Seabirds competed over a weeks worth of racing which gained considerable praise from the yachting press. Further inter club racing was held in the Menai Strait in August 1903 and returned to Belfast Lough during the summer of 1904.

There was great enthusiasm at this time and the 1902 August edition of The Yachtsman reporting on the Menai Strait Regattas states "none of the Threequarter Raters which generally give good sport at the Regattas were able to sail down but the Seabirds managed to arrive by rail in time for the first day at Caernarvon".
 
In 1902 Caernarvon SC adopted the Class and the boats were known as 'Cariads'.
 
Some years later the Class was adopted by West Kirby Sailing Club, Liverpool Yacht Club and Wallasey Yacht Club. By the time the Seabirds, Seashells and Cariads O.D. Association was formed in the autumn of 1905 to keep the One Design concept intact 31 boats had been built. In 1908 R. Perry & Son, Birkenhead were appointed sail makers, their price being £3 19s 6d for a full suit.

In 1910 it was agreed that the Association Burgee be a "White Seagull" on a red background. Prior to the First World War, 41 boats had been built and were racing regularly and the cost of a new boat had risen to £60.

The association was strict in its principles and at a meeting at the West Kirby clubhouse in October 1912 decided not to admit one Seabird built by Roberts of Chester. The entry was refused on the grounds that he had been given authority to build five boats, not six. The rules were so strictly adhered to that this Seabird, Seasnipe number 33, was not recognised by the association until 1963.

The first Half Rater appeared in Trearddur Bay in 1921, and she presented a problem because, although she conformed to the design, she had broken the Seabird Association rules by being built singly and for one specific owner. However, when they found that she was no better than the others the Association accepted her as legitimate. A year later in 1922 Trearddur Bay Sailing Club  officially adopted the Class.

In 1924 the newly formed South Caernarvonshire YC offered races in June for Seabirds. The first race at SCYC was held on the 9th of June between 5 boats of the seabird class (four of them new). By the onset of world war 2 in 1938, 81 seabirds had been constructed with 17 sailing at Abersoch, 12 on the Mersey, 8 at Trearddur Bay, 7 at West Kirby, 5 had returned to Southport where racing on the bog hole had resumed, 4 in the Menai Straits, 2 at Lytham and single boats at Holyhead, Windermere, Torquay and Potter Heigham. Osprey, number 41, was in the Isle of Man but she had been modified out of class by having a metal keel added, although there were plans to purchase her and restore her to seabird association specifications.

The 60's saw a revival in the building programme of ten new boats, by this time the price of a seabird had risen to around £800. A news article at the time claimed there was a buyers market for "at least one new seabird per year". In 1965 there were 56 seabirds sailing regularly, mainly at Trearddur Bay (24 boats), Abersoch (21 boats), 6 boats at West Cheshire Sailing Club on the Mersey and single boats at Holyhead, Rhyl and Conway, although Cormorant, number 9, was being used as a fishing boat out of Liverpool docks. The Association became affiliated to the RYA.

Hurricane Charlie in 1986 resulted in 10 of the fleet at Abersoch being sunk and badly damaged but they were all salvaged and the repairs were carried out by AMP Marine of Birkenhead.

The present day fleet is based in North Wales at Trearddur Bay and Abersoch and on the Mersey at Wallasey. 1979 saw recognition by the Guinness Book of Yachting that the Seabird Half Rater is the oldest OD Class still racing in Britain, and the Liverpool Maritime Museum hold the Association documents on loan.
 
The highlight of 1999 class centenary year was when the three Stations raced together in the Menai Strait Regattas when 47 Seabirds out of a total fleet of 65 met. Many of the older boats have been lovingly restored and the regattas saw Goshawk No 2, the winner of that very first race in 1899, racing against Oystercatcher No 100 which was built in 1998.

The price of a new boat is in the region of £36,000, a far cry from £34 7s 6d in 1899.

Dimensions

Length overall: 20 ft.
Length on load water line: 16 ft. 4in.
Beam at deck: 6 ft.
Beam at load water line: 5 ft. 6in.
Draft: 1 ft. 3in.
Sail area: 182.2sq. ft.

Racing regulations

The safety of every seabird is the responsibility of the owner and/or helm.
Each Seabird must hold a valid racing certificate issued by the association.
Each Seabird must have valid insurance covering the boat and crew against liability in respect of third party claims for at least half a million pounds whilst racing.
Every Seabird must carry at least 2 crew and personal buoyancy must be worn at all times.
Each Seabird must carry:
An anchor weighing no less than 9.1 kg.
17 to 20 fathoms of quarter inch small link chain.
One pair of oars and rowlocks or a sculling oar and rowlock.
Distress flares.
No Seabird may take part in a race for boats of the Seabird class unless it has been weighed and the weight is not less than the minimum regulation weight, 650 kg for the hull (centre plate, rudder, floorboards (and deck seats/buoyancy where fitted)) and 245 kg of ballast after the boat has been in commission for 28 days. If a Seabird is under this weight then additional ballast shall be added in positions designated by the committee.

Sails

Racing under strict one design rules Seabird Half Rater sails are only supplied by only 2 sailmakers, Sanders Sails and North Sails. Sails must be measured by the official class measurer and stamped before use in races. No more than 3 sails, a mainsail, jib and spinnaker may be flown at any one time while racing. Sails may be coloured, but the most common colour is white, and they must display the number designated to the boat by the seabird association.

In 1889 a full suit [ mainsail, jib and spinnaker] of sails cost £3 19s 6d, this had risen to £52 by 1965 and currently costs in the region of £1,250.

Sail battens and Headboards are not allowed. However the class is trialing the use of windows in existing sails.

The spinnaker boom may not be passed to leeward of the forestay and its length must not exceed 8 ft overall.

Equipment not sanctioned
Bottle screws.
Kicking straps.
Winches.
Joined tillers.
Sliding fairleads.
barber haulers.
Topping lifts, downhauls and sliding mast tracks for spinnaker boom attachments.
The covering of the keel centre board slot with strips of any material.
Toe straps

Modifications sanctioned
Jamming cleats and blocks.
All wire main halyards or Spectra rope.
Buoyancy (as long as no structural alterations are made to the hull.)
The main sheet may not have more than a three part purchase and no block on the boom may be positioned beyond 7 ft 0" forwards of the lacing hole.
Replaceable plastic gudgeon bearings.
The use of epoxy glue and fillers on all repair work.

Current fleet

References

Keelboats
One-design sailing classes